A chamber ballet is a chamber music performance or work that features one or more ballet dancers. Examples are a chamber music composition with the addition of dancers, or a full-scale ballet performed using a smaller ensemble.

Den Collinske Gård in Copenhagen was a venue pioneering chamber ballet performances in 2010–11.

References

Ballet music